Southern Island may refer to

Yuzhny Island, an island in Russia
The Hoenn Region in Pokémon
, a British cargo ship in service from 1947 to 1951